The 1987 World Junior Ice Hockey Championships (1987 WJHC) was the 11th edition of the Ice Hockey World Junior Championship and was held in Piešťany, Trenčín, Nitra, and Topoľčany, Czechoslovakia (now Slovakia).  Finland captured its first World Junior gold medal, Czechoslovakia took silver, and Sweden the bronze. The tournament is most remembered, however, for how the medals were allocated.

Punch-up in Piestany

With 6:07 left in the second period of the final game of the tournament between Canada and the Soviet Union, Pavel Kostichkin took a two-handed slash at Theoren Fleury, sparking a fight between the two; the USSR's Evgeny Davydov left the bench to assist Valeri Zelepukin in the fight, who was already playing the game with a separated shoulder, and was being pummeled by Canadian forward Mike Keane. Davydov's intervention sparked one of the most infamous bench-clearing brawls in international hockey history.

The officials, unable to break up the brawl, walked off the ice and tournament officials eventually tried shutting off the arena lights, but the brawl lasted for 20 minutes before the International Ice Hockey Federation declared the contest null and void. An emergency meeting was held following the brawl that ended with the delegates voting 7–1 to eject both teams from the tournament, with the sole dissenter being Canadian Dennis McDonald. The Canadian team, disgusted at what they perceived to be a conspiracy against them, chose to leave rather than stay for the end-of-tournament dinner, from which the Soviet team were banned.

While the Soviets were out of medal contention, Canada was playing for the gold medal, and were leading 4–2 at the time of the brawl (they needed to win by at least five goals to claim the gold). Even had they lost the game, they were assured at least the bronze medal. Afterwards, Soviet hockey official Anatoly Kastriukov claimed that the hostilities were fueled by a Canadian trainer who he alleged had punched one of the Soviet assistant coaches in the stomach. Some Canadians maintained that the Soviets had started the brawl by leaving their bench first, and had deliberately done so with the intention of getting Canada ejected. Soviet administrator Yuri Korolev expressed regret that the incident occurred but did not admit any guilt. He felt that the game should have been finished instead of both teams being disqualified from the tournament.

The ejections of the Canadian and Soviet teams had the retroactive effect of making the Finland-Czechoslovakia game (played earlier the same day) the gold medal game, while the Sweden-United States game became the bronze medal contest, and the Poland-Switzerland game determined who placed fifth. The loser of the latter game (Switzerland) was relegated, just as they were had the brawl not occurred. Poland avoided relegation despite giving up 80 goals in 7 games.

Final standings

 was relegated to Pool B for the 1988 World Junior Ice Hockey Championships.

Results
All times are local. (Central European Time – UTC+1)

Scoring leaders

Canada and the USSR were disqualified from the final scoring standings; Canada's Pat Elynuik had 11 points.

Tournament awards

Pool B
Took place from March 15 to 21 in Rouen France.  Two groups of four played round robins, the top two and bottom two from the respective groups met up in two final round robins to determine placement.  Teams did not replay opponents they were grouped with previously, their scores were carried forward to the final rounds.

Preliminary round
Group A

Group B

Final Round
Promotion Group

West Germany was promoted to Pool A for 1988.

Relegation Group

Italy was Demoted to Pool C for 1988.

Pool C
Pool C was played in Esbjerg, Denmark from March 16 to 22.
Standings

Yugoslavia was promoted to Pool B for 1988.

References

 
 Results at Passionhockey.com

World Junior Ice Hockey Championships
World Junior Ice Hockey Championships
1987 World Junior Ice Hockey Championships
December 1986 sports events in Europe
January 1987 sports events in Europe
March 1987 sports events in Europe
Trenčín
Sport in Nitra
Sport in Rouen
1986–87 in French ice hockey
1986–87 in Danish ice hockey
Sport in Esbjerg
International ice hockey competitions hosted by France
International ice hockey competitions hosted by Denmark